Clark Chapin is a Republican member of the Connecticut Senate, representing the 30th District since 2013. Chapin is the State Senator for the 30th Senate District since 2013, representing Litchfield County in the Connecticut Senate, including the towns of Brookfield, Canaan, Cornwall, Goshen, Kent, Litchfield, Morris, New Milford, North Canaan, Salisbury, Sharon, Torrington (part), Warren, and Winchester.

Chapin earned his B.S. in animal science and technology from the University of Rhode Island and recently earned his M.S. in community development from Iowa State University.

See also

Connecticut Senate

References

Republican Party Connecticut state senators
University of Rhode Island alumni
Iowa State University alumni
Year of birth missing (living people)
Living people
21st-century American politicians
People from New Milford, Connecticut